Cliff Young may refer to:

 Cliff Young, founding member and vocalist of Caedmon's Call 
 Cliff Young (athlete) (1922–2003), Australian potato farmer and athlete from Beech Forest, Victoria
 Cliff Young (baseball) (1964–1993), baseball pitcher
 Clifford E. Young (1883–1958), general authority of The Church of Jesus Christ of Latter-day Saints
 C. Clifton "Cliff" Young (1922–2016), Nevada politician, member of the U.S. House of Representatives (1953–1957)